Jason's Tomb (Hebrew: kever Yason) is a rock-cut tomb dating to the first century BCE in the Hasmonean period, discovered in the Rehavia neighborhood in Jerusalem, Israel. It has been identified as the burial site of a certain Jason, possibly a naval commander, based on the charcoal drawing of two warships discovered in the cave.

Discovery and research
The tomb was discovered in 1956 and the authorities in charge of antiquities expropriated the site from its owners in order to preserve it. Levi Yitzhak Rahmani excavated it and published his findings in 1967.

The tomb is considered to date from the time of Alexander Jannaeus (r. 103–76 BCE). A ceramic assemblage found here was dated by one expert, Rachel Bar-Nathan, to no later than the 31 BC Judea earthquake, a date not readily accepted by everyone. Coins found at the site date to the first third of the first century CE. The tomb was finally blocked in 30/31 CE.

Description
The building consists of a courtyard and a single Doric column decorating the entrance to the burial chamber, topped with a reconstructed pyramid-shaped roof. Among the carved inscriptions in Greek and Aramaic is one that laments the deceased Jason: "A powerful lament make for Jason, son of P... (my brother) peace ... who hast built thyself a tomb, Elder rest in peace."

Another inscription states that Jason sailed to the coast of Egypt. Inside the cave are eight burial niches. To make room for additional burials the bones were later removed to the charnel space in front.

See also
 Jason (high priest)
 Rock-cut tombs in Israel
 Archaeology in Israel

References

Buildings and structures completed in the 1st century BC
1956 archaeological discoveries
Rock-cut tombs
Burial monuments and structures
Archaeological sites in Jerusalem
Jewish cemeteries in Israel
Jewish mausoleums
Cemeteries in Jerusalem
Rehavia
Tombs in Israel